Jonathan Benteke Lifeka (born 28 April 1995) is a Belgian footballer who plays as a forward.

Career

Early career
Benteke played youth football for JS Pierreuse before moving to the higher level Standard Liège in 2006 where he stayed for a season before moving to Visé's youth side. In 2009, he moved back to Standard where he played for four seasons in their youth teams without appearing for the first team. On his release from Standard, he rejoined Visé, where he made his professional first team appearance and was at the time playing in the Belgian Second Division. While at C.S. Visé, Benteke went on to make eighteen appearances and scoring two times.

Zulte-Waregem

On 24 June 2014, it was reported that Benteke was in talks over a move to Zulte-Waregem. The move was confirmed on 28 June 2014, when he signed a three-year contract.

However, at the start of the season, Benteke suffered a groin injury and did not return to training until September. It was not until 27 September 2014 that Benteke made his Zulte Waregem debut against Anderlecht, replacing Glynor Plet after 70 minutes. It was not until 21 January 2015 that he scored his first Zulte-Waregem goal, in a 4–2 loss against Anderlecht in the quarter-final of Beker Van Belgie. Benteke went on to score two goals in the league against Genk and Oostende. At the end of the 2014–15 season, Benteke had made eight appearances, scoring three times in all competitions.

However, the 2015–16 season saw Benteke competing for a first-team role under the management of Francky Dury. As a result, Benteke spent the most of the season on the substitutes bench and did not score goals in his seventeen appearances in all competitions that season.

Crystal Palace
On 1 September 2016, Benteke joined the development squad of Premier League side Crystal Palace, where his brother played.

Nine days later he made his debut in a 2–1 win at Middlesbrough, replacing his sibling for the final six minutes; they were the first Belgian brothers to play in England's top flight. At the end of the month, he suffered a knee meniscus injury, ruling him out for the next three or four months; his manager Alan Pardew called this "disappointing". Benteke was released by the club at the end of the 2016–17 season.

Omonia Nicosia
In September 2017, Cypriot First Division club Omonia Nicosia signed Benteke on a two-year contract.

Oldham Athletic

On 6 February 2018, Benteke signed with League One Club Oldham Athletic on a short term deal until the end of the season. On 27 July, Benteke signed a new one-year contract with the club.

After a spell in Germany, Benteke returned in Belgium in August 2020 to join URSL Visé.

Personal life
Benteke is of Congolese descent and was born in Belgium to Congolese parents, and is the younger brother of Christian Benteke, who plays as a forward for DC United and the Belgium national team.

Career statistics

References

External links

1995 births
Living people
Belgian sportspeople of Democratic Republic of the Congo descent
Footballers from Liège
Belgian footballers
Association football forwards
S.V. Zulte Waregem players
Crystal Palace F.C. players
AC Omonia players
Oldham Athletic A.F.C. players
Alemannia Aachen players
URSL Visé players
FC Wegberg-Beeck players
Loudoun United FC players
Belgian Pro League players
Premier League players
Cypriot First Division players
English Football League players
Regionalliga players
Belgian National Division 1 players
USL Championship players
Belgian expatriate footballers
Belgian expatriate sportspeople in England
Belgian expatriate sportspeople in Cyprus
Belgian expatriate sportspeople in Germany
Belgian expatriate sportspeople in the United States
Expatriate footballers in England
Expatriate footballers in Cyprus
Expatriate footballers in Germany
Expatriate soccer players in the United States